NA-266 Killa Abdullah-cum-Chaman is a constituency for the National Assembly of Pakistan.

Assembly Segments

Members of Parliament

2018-2022: NA-263 Killa Abdullah

Election 2002 

General elections were held on 10 Oct 2002. Mehmood Khan Achakzai of Pakhtun-khwa Milli Awami Party won by 35,385 votes.

Election 2008 

General elections were held on 18 Feb 2008. Haji Rozuddin of Muttahida Majlis-e-Amal won by 45,590 votes.

Election 2013 

General elections were held on 11 May 2013. Abdul Qahar Khan Wadan of Pakhtun-khwa Milli Awami Party won by 47,873 and became the member of National Assembly.

Election 2018 

General elections were held on 25 July 2018.

See also
NA-265 Ziarat-cum-Pishin-cum-Karezat
NA-1 Upper Chitral-cum-Lower Chitral

References

External links
Election result's official website

NA-262